Events from the year 1899 in Scotland.

Incumbents 

 Secretary for Scotland and Keeper of the Great Seal – Lord Balfour of Burleigh

Law officers 
 Lord Advocate – Andrew Murray
 Solicitor General for Scotland – Charles Dickson

Judiciary 
 Lord President of the Court of Session and Lord Justice General – Lord Robertson to 21 November; then Lord Blair Balfour
 Lord Justice Clerk – Lord Kingsburgh

Events 
 March – supposed last duel in Scotland, fought with swords in the University of Glasgow over the appointment of a Rector, perhaps a student hoax.
 13 March – Japanese battleship Asahi launched by John Brown & Company, Clydebank.
 16 June – Penicuik House gutted by fire.
 July – Norman Heathcote climbs the St Kilda sea stack Stac Lee with his sister Evelyn.
 November – English occultist Aleister Crowley purchases Boleskine House near Foyers on the shore of Loch Ness from the Fraser family, occupying it until 1913.
 7 December – Flannan Isles Lighthouse first lit.
 15 December – Glasgow School of Art opens its new building, the most notable work of Charles Rennie Mackintosh.
 30 December – the Albion Motor Car Company is set up in Glasgow; and the first Argyll car is also produced this year.
 George Campbell, 8th Duke of Argyll, presents Iona Abbey and other sacred sites of the island of Iona to the Iona Cathedral Trust (linked to the Church of Scotland).
 First Skerries Bridge, linking Bruray to Housay in the Out Skerries, is built.

Births 
 24 June – Bruce Marshall, writer (died 1987 in France)
 8 October – Dorothy Donaldson Buchanan, civil engineer (died 1985 in England)

Deaths 
 6 June – Robert Wallace, classics teacher, minister, university professor, newspaper editor, barrister and Member of Parliament (born 1831)
 14 September – William Watson, Baron Watson, former Lord Advocate (born 1827)

See also 
 Timeline of Scottish history
 1899 in the United Kingdom

References 

 
Years of the 19th century in Scotland
Scotland
1890s in Scotland